John M. Wimer (May 8, 1810January 11, 1863) served as Postmaster, Alderman and the seventh person to serve as mayor of St. Louis, Missouri.

Born in Amherst County, Virginia in 1810, he came west in 1828, initially a blacksmith in St. Louis.

He served two terms as mayor (1843-1844 and 1857-1858), the ninth and nineteenth term served as mayor of St. Louis. Between terms he received his postmaster's appointment on June 14, 1845, after President James K. Polk entered office and just 17 days before the effective date of the 1845 postal reforms, which paved the way for adhesive stamp use by simplifying the rate structure.  As Postmaster, John Wimer is known for issuing the "St Louis Bears" a set of provisional postal stamps that are now highly valued as collectibles. Wimer was replaced as postmaster in 1850.

Although he opposed slavery, when the American Civil War broke out, Wimer spoke out strongly for the Confederacy and his native state of Virginia; In 1862 he was arrested and held at Gratiot Street Military Prison and Alton Penitientiary, but Wimer escaped in December 1862 and reached southwest Missouri where he joined the Confederate army under Colonel Emmett MacDonald and Brigadier-General John S. Marmaduke.

He was killed at the Battle of Hartville, in Hartville, Missouri, during which, "Lieutenant-Colonel Wimer was shot dead whilst leading the detachment of Colonel Burbridge's regiment.". It is reported that Wimer was shot through the eye, and after he died that "the yankee Provost Marshal managed to steal his body during the wake, and buried him in an unknown potters field as a final act of desecration. After the war, his body was moved to Bellefontaine Cemetery in St. Louis.

References 

 
 

 
 "Marmaduke's Expedition into Missouri". Index to the Miscellaneous Documents of the House of Representatives. Congressional edition, Volume 2580. United States Congress. U.S. Government Printing Office, 1889, p. 207. https://books.google.com/books/about/Congressional_edition.html?id=bEBHAQAAIAAJ
 Frelinghuysen Collection Part 1., St Louis Postmasters' Provisionals (Page 133). Robert A. Siegel Auctions. (2012, March 28) Retrieved 02:16, March 24, 2014, from http://siegelauctions.com/enc/pdf/StLouis.pdf

External links 
 John M. Wimer at the St. Louis Public Library: St. Louis Mayors website.
 Frelinghuysen Collection Part 1., St Louis Postmasters' Provisionals (Page 133). Robert A. Siegel Auctions. (2012, March 28)
Retrieved 02:16, March 24, 2014, from http://siegelauctions.com/enc/pdf/StLouis.pdf
 "Marmaduke's Expedition into Missouri". Index to the Miscellaneous Documents of the House of Representatives. 
Congressional edition, Volume 2580. United States Congress. U.S. Government Printing Office, 1889.
 https://books.google.com/books/about/Congressional_edition.html?id=bEBHAQAAIAAJ

1810 births
1863 deaths
Mayors of St. Louis
People from Amherst County, Virginia
1863 in Missouri
19th-century American politicians
United States politicians killed during the Civil War